Big Brother Canada is a reality game show that began airing in 2013 on Slice, and later on Global. The series is part of the global Big Brother franchise. Contestants on the show, referred to as HouseGuests, compete for a $100,000 prize among other luxuries. Since its inception, the show has had a total of one hundred six official HouseGuests over the course of eight seasons. Of these contestants, forty-five were men while forty-five were women. Two brothers competed as one HouseGuest during the fourth season, while six potential HouseGuests failed to gain access to the house throughout the show.

HouseGuests

Notes

: Information such as age, profession, and residence are at the time of entry in the house.

Contestants competing in International versions

Deaths

2021
 April 9 - Nikki Grahame, Big Brother Canada 4 houseguest. (b. 1982)

References

Big Brother Canada
Big Brother Canada